Petrolia Oil Field is a North Texas segment of land located in Clay County, Texas and the Great Plains. The hydrocarbon exploration site was geographically within  of the Red River of the South. The oil and gas reservoir was located between Texas State Highway 79 and Texas State Highway 148 converging at Petrolia, Texas.

The sandstone geology was discovered in 1904 as having deposits of fossil fuels. The Dorthulia Dunn No. One blowout produced . The Clay County oil reservoir reached peak production in 1914 yielding .

By 1915, the oil field had received national recognition as the first natural gas reservoir producing a light non-flammable inert gas known as helium. The Petrolia sandstone plain was the premier producer of helium culminating in the United States Bureau of Mines and United States Department of War constructing a helium extraction plant near Petrolia, Texas.

Global Helium Demand and World War I

The North Texas noble gas production site served as the primary helium source for the United States during the 1910s and World War I. The Great War created a supply and demand economic model as charged by Allies of World War I necessitating the demand for lifting gas. The upthrust gas leveraged the commitment for a counter-offensive deterrent in Europe opposing the Zeppelin raids as executed by the German strategic bombing during World War I.

United States Helium Production Plant No. 1

On October 22, 1918, the United States government entered an agreement with Linde Air Products Company for the construction and operations of a helium processing plant located northwest of Forth Worth, Texas. The Bureau of Yards and Docks served as the architect for the structural design of the buildings and facilities housing the helium production operations.

The cryogenic fuel facility resided in the north Fort Worth rural area of Blue Mound, Texas. The  industrial superfluidity gas site was located at the intersection of Farm to Market Road 156 and Meacham Boulevard bearing east of Fort Worth Meacham International Airport.

In April 1921, the Fort Worth natural gas processing plant began production operations sustaining production yields for nine years.

In the early 1920s, the United States Navy constructed a dirigible balloon mooring station within  of the Fort Worth helium plant.
During 1924 to 1929, Fort Worth served as a service site for airships completing transcontinental flights.

On January 10, 1929, the United States Helium Production Plant No. 1 ceased operations in Fort Worth transitioning the helium production to the Amarillo helium plant.

Exhaustion of the Petrolia Reservoir
Upon the lapse of federal appropriations and gas depletion of the fossil fuel reservoir production yield, the Petrolia helium plant sustained the non-reactive gas processing of the monatomic gas from 1915 to 1921.

Reservoir in Texas Panhandle
The Cliffside natural gas reservoir became the preeminent helium source for the United States after the cessation of the North Texas gas field in the 1920s.

1904–1910 photographs
Pictorial articles are provided by the Clay County Historical Society.

Pictorial biography

See also

Applications of Balloons

Monatomic Gas Scientists of Standards Development Era

References

Further reading

Historical Video Archive

External links
 
 
 
 
 
 
 

1904 in Texas
Clay County, Texas
Geography of Clay County, Texas
Oil fields in Texas